Roqeh-ye Soghirah (also Romanized as Roq‘eh-ye Şoghīrah; also known as Roq‘eh and Roq‘eh-ye Şoghrá) is a village in Heruz Rural District, Kuhsaran District, Ravar County, Kerman Province, Iran. At the 2006 census, its population was 47, in 13 families.

References 

Populated places in Ravar County